Åkerøyhamn is a village in Lillesand municipality in Agder county, Norway.

References

Villages in Agder
Lillesand